The Cayman Islands Olympic Committee was founded in 1973 and was recognised by the IOC (International Olympic Committee) in 1976. From the beginning as a fledgling association, undertaking but a few tasks, it has now developed to a body representative of 22 member-sports, with significant undertakings at home and abroad. It is also the body responsible for the representation of the Cayman Islands at the Commonwealth Games. Donald McLean, who competed at the 1996 Summer Olympics, became the committee's president in 2005.

See also
Cayman Islands at the Olympics
Cayman Islands at the Commonwealth Games

References

External links
 Cayman Islands Olympic Committee

Cayman Islands
Cayman Islands
Cayman Islands at the Olympics
Sports governing bodies in the Cayman Islands
Sports organizations established in 1973
1973 establishments in the Cayman Islands